Refuge Aoste is a mountain hut in the Valpelline, in the Pennine Alps, owned by the Club Alpino Italiano. It is in the commune of Bionaz, Aosta Valley, Italy.

History 
The first refuge was built in 1908, but destroyed by an avalanche in 1951. It was rebuilt and inaugurated in 1956, but in 1990 lost its roof. The current hut opened in 1995.

External links 
Mountain huts in the Alps
Mountain huts in Aosta Valley
Mountain huts of Club Alpino Italiano

 Official website